Sandrina Louisa Geertruida Holthuysen (1824 – 1895) was a Dutch art collector and founder of the Museum Willet-Holthuysen in Amsterdam.

Biography
Holthuysen was born in Amsterdam in the Netherlands as the only child of Pieter Gerard Holthuysen, a wealthy merchant who dealt in window glass and coal. Her father died in 1858 and in 1861 she married Abraham Willet and they proceeded to live a bohemian lifestyle, enjoying travel and art collecting. The art collection included items bought by her, of which the most expensive painting was a still-life by Blaise Alexandre Desgoffe that cost 5,000 guilders.

Holthuysen died childless in Amsterdam in 1895, a few years after her husband. Her house and its contents, including the artworks, were left to the City of Amsterdam, conditional upon the building being used as a museum named after her and her husband.

Gallery

References

Further reading

External links
 Museum Willet-Holthuysen (Dutch)

1824 births
1895 deaths
Art collectors from Amsterdam
Museum founders
Dutch socialites